Lake Sumner is a  census-designated place (CDP) in De Baca County, New Mexico, United States. The population was 143 at the 2010 census, up from the figure of 86 recorded in 2000.

Geography
Lake Sumner is located in northern De Baca County at  (34.612692, -104.401809). The CDP surrounds Lake Sumner, a reservoir formed by Sumner Dam on the Pecos River. Sumner Lake State Park occupies the east and west sides of the lake at its south end, near the outlet. U.S. Route 84 forms the northeastern edge of the CDP; the highway leads southeast  to Fort Sumner, the De Baca County seat, and northwest  to Santa Rosa.

Climate

According to the Köppen Climate Classification system, Lake Sumner has a cold semi-arid climate, abbreviated "BSk" on climate maps.

Demographics

As of the census of 2000, there were 86 people, 44 households, and 27 families residing in the CDP. The population density was 1.4 people per square mile (0.5/km2). There were 188 housing units at an average density of 3.0/sq mi (1.2/km2). The racial makeup of the CDP was 90.70% White, 1.16% Asian, 3.49% from other races, and 4.65% from two or more races. Hispanic or Latino of any race were 17.44% of the population.

There were 44 households, out of which 18.2% had children under the age of 18 living with them, 61.4% were married couples living together, and 38.6% were non-families. 34.1% of all households were made up of individuals, and 13.6% had someone living alone who was 65 years of age or older. The average household size was 1.95 and the average family size was 2.48.

In the CDP, the population was spread out, with 14.0% under the age of 18, 4.7% from 18 to 24, 17.4% from 25 to 44, 33.7% from 45 to 64, and 30.2% who were 65 years of age or older. The median age was 52 years. For every 100 females, there were 120.5 males. For every 100 females age 18 and over, there were 111.4 males.

The median income for a household in the CDP was $25,250, and the median income for a family was $29,167. Males had a median income of $28,750 versus $23,750 for females. The per capita income for the CDP was $17,590. There were no families and 10.5% of the population living below the poverty line, including no under eighteens and 45.5% of those over 64.

Education
Fort Sumner Municipal Schools is the school district of all of De Baca County.

See also

 List of census-designated places in New Mexico

References

External links

Census-designated places in De Baca County, New Mexico
Census-designated places in New Mexico